Devils Punchbowl is a bowl-shaped cove (an empty cirque, the floor of which is below sea level) in the southwest corner of Granite Harbor, between Devils Ridge and the south side of The Flatiron, in Victoria Land. Charted and named by the British Antarctic Expedition, 1910-13, under Scott.

References 

Geography of Antarctica